Wrocław Exhibition Grounds (Polish: Tereny wystawowe) are located in eastern part of the city close to the zoological garden. Construction works took place in years 1911-1913 according to the project of Max Berg and Hans Poelzig.

History
The Exhibition Grounds were designed in the honor of centennial anniversary of king Frederick Wilhelm III's proclamation to the German nation (An mein Volk) in 1813 and an anniversary of the Battle of Leipzig. In 1913, a Centennial Exhibition was held here. Site survived the Second World War without any significant damage. In 1948, the Recovered Lands Exhibition was held at this venue.

Description

Currently Exhibition Grounds include:

 Centennial Hall, one of the Wrocław's main tourist attractions (listed as an UNESCO World Heritage Site in 2006
 Pergola, build around a pond where in 2009 one of the biggest European fountains (Wrocław Fountain) was built
 Japanese Garden was established as a part of Exhibition Complex. However a lot of plants were taken after the Centennial Exhibition Garden was reestablished in 1997 in cooperation with Japanese specialists, following all the traditional criteria of Japanese garden art. Two months later during the flood in Wroclaw the area was damaged. The Japanese garden was re-opened again in 1999. Today the Garden, keeping Japanese traditions, also presents many species of Asian plants.
 The Four Domes Pavilion is located north west from Centennial Hall. It was designed by Hans Poelzig. It was built from August 1912 to February 1913. Fountain of Goddess Athena was placed on the courtyard of the building (destroyed during World War II). After 1945 Pavilion was adopted as a movie studio (WWF). Currently, it houses the National Museum.

See also 

 Amor on Pegasus

References

 Encyklopedia Wrocławia, Wydawnictwo Dolnośląskie 2006 Centenary Hall (a work of Max Berg), VIA NOVA

Buildings and structures in Wrocław
Tourist attractions in Wrocław